Handsworth Rugby Football Club is a junior rugby club formed in 1887, originally in the area of Birmingham known as Handsworth but with its ground now in nearby Walsall.

History
The exact origins of Handsworth Rugby Club are unclear.  However, according to old newspapers, reported statements and speeches it seems certain that Handsworth Football Club (Rugby Rules) existed in 1870, a year before the founding of the Rugby Union. They played on a field in Heathfield Road, Handsworth and had regular fixtures with Moseley and Gloucester. During 1874-75, Handsworth appears on the fixture card of Coventry RFC. The club then went through a lean period, before a more settled club was formed during 1886 and the Club Captain was Charlie Greener.

In 1887, the club secured a piece of land at Brownes Green in Handsworth and the members laid the pitch and converted scaffold poles into goal posts. The changing rooms were situated at the Lamp Tavern Public House, Hamstead Road. The first President was Mr W.G.Griffiths.

During the 1887/88 season, George Wade joined the Club. In June 1891 he made his first professional stage appearance as George Robey. George was to become one of the most successful comedians of the music hall stage, securing the nickname of The Prime Minister of Mirth.

During the 1880s, Handsworth was still part of Staffordshire, hence the adoption of the Staffordshire Knot on the club tie. The club's playing shirt and colours were formally adopted at the AGM on 15 September 1905, although the records show that the players had been using red and white hooped shirts since 1894.

In December 1904, Handsworth became involved in a national scandal that became known as The Parsons Affair. The club was fined £5 plus expenses of £8 19s 8d, for playing A T Parsons who was ineligible to play rugby union as he had previously represented Hull Kingston Rovers,a rugby league team, under the name of Robinson.

In 1905, T B Batchelor joined as a holiday member, and was the club's only England International, playing against France before of a crowd of 6,000 at Richmond, with England winning 41 to 13.

In the 1912 season, J.M.C. 'Clem' Lewis played for the club against Moseley, inspiring a rare victory against illustrious rivals. Clem, described as "one of the finest players who ever wore a Handsworth jersey", played for Wales against England on 20 January 1912 (lost 8-0). In the 1913 international, he played against Scotland (won 8-0) scoring one try and kicking one conversion; France (won 11-8) scoring one try and kicking one conversion; Ireland (won 16-3). In 1914, England (lost 9-10), Scotland (won 24-5), France (won 31-0), Ireland (won 11-3) kicking one conversion and scoring one drop goal. In 1923, he captained Wales for two matches against England (lost 7-3) and Scotland (11-8).

Following World War I, the club moved grounds several times looking for a permanent home, including: Brownes Green, Worlds End Lane, a piece of land at the bottom of Hampstead Hill (changing rooms at The Beaufort Arms Public House) and Perry Barr Stadium. This period of instability lasted until after the Second World War, when the club was offered the opportunity to purchase a field next to the Birmingham Road, Walsall. The Birmingham Road land was eventually bought in January 1948, and the first changing rooms were ex-army huts, soon to be known as George Lewis Erection after the purchaser of said huts. The first game at the new ground was on 11 September 1948 against Standard Motors of Coventry. Handsworth lost 3-19. The first home victory was on 16 October 1948 against Hinckley, 8-3.

In March 1973, Walsall Metropolitan Borough Council finally gave planning permission for a new Club House to be built. Work began on 5 February 1974 and the building was finally opened on 15 September 1974.

On 26 September 1986, the club celebrated its centenary with a Centenary Dinner at the Grand Hotel, Birmingham. The club was honoured by the presence of A A Grimsdale, President Rugby Football Union, Mike Gibson, Ireland, P G D Robbins, England and Barbarians, two members of the Romanian touring team and representatives from 32 clubs.

Competition
The First XV currently competes in Midlands 3 West (North) in the Midlands Division

Address
The Charles Lewis Memorial Ground, 450 Birmingham Road, Walsall, West Midlands, WS5 3JP

Club honours
Staffordshire 1 champions (3): 1988–89, 1991–92, 2002–03
Staffordshire/Warwickshire 1 champions: 1999–00
Midlands 6 West (North) champions: 2006–07
Midlands 5 West (North) champions: 2007–08
Staffordshire Intermediate Cup winners: 2012
Midlands 3 West (North) champions: 2014–15

See also
Midlands RFU
Staffordshire RU

External links
 Handsworth Rugby Football Club Pitchero Page

English rugby union teams
Sport in Walsall